WarJetz (sometimes called World Destruction League: WarJetz) is an air combat arcade game developed and published by The 3DO Company and released in 2001 on the PlayStation and PlayStation 2 consoles. A planned Game Boy Color version was canceled. It is the successor to World Destruction League: Thunder Tanks, released the year before.

Gameplay
The game takes place in a fixed third-person perspective as the player pilots a variety of futuristic aircraft in order to do battle with enemies on the ground and in the air while collecting power-ups and in-game currency known as "bux". Players can take two different jets into battle and switch between them using a collectable power-up. In all, there are nine different airplanes, thirty-three arenas, and five game modes. Most of the game modes fall into common categories such as search and destroy along with capture the flag.

Reception

The PlayStation 2 version received "mixed" reviews according to the review aggregation website Metacritic. Frank Provo, writing for GameSpot, said of the same console version that the developers deserved credit for "creating a dog-fighting system that is simultaneously intuitive and diverse". He went on to criticize the graphics, specifically, "muddy textures, 2D explosions, blocky structures, disappearing polygons, and frequent slowdown". David Smith of IGN shared similar sentiment with regards to the graphics of the same console version, noting the dull palette of greens, browns, and grays and the muddy textures. He went on to praise the simple controls and entertaining voice acting, but denounced the gameplay as dull and easy. He concluded that "Four-player support should have been included." Rob Smolka of NextGen said of the same console version, "There's a lot to see and do, but the bell-shaped fun curve peaks too soon, and you'll likely lose interest before the end."

References

External links
 

2001 video games
The 3DO Company games
Action video games
Cancelled Game Boy Color games
Combat flight simulators
PlayStation (console) games
PlayStation 2 games
Video games developed in the United States
Video games set in the future
Multiplayer and single-player video games